Simon Ithel Davies (born 23 April 1974) is a Welsh professional football coach and former player who is currently the Head of Coaching Methodology at Tottenham Hotspur's academy.

As a player, he was a midfielder who notably played in the Premier League for Manchester United, where he was part of the famous 1992 youth team. He later played in The Football League for Exeter City, Huddersfield Town, Luton Town, Macclesfield Town and Rochdale. He wound up his playing days in the Welsh Premier League with Bangor City, Total Network Solutions, Rhyl and Airbus UK. He was capped once for Wales, in a match against Switzerland in 1996.

Davies went into coaching towards the end of his career, where he was a youth team coach at Chester City. He was caretaker manager of the club in 2007 and 2008. In 2010, Davies joined Manchester City where he eventually became the EDS manager and the Head of the Youth Academy. In 2019 he joined the coaching staff at Anderlecht and briefly managed the club before relinquishing his duties and reverting to his previous role. In August 2022, Davies became Head of Coaching Methodology at Tottenham Hotspur's academy.

Playing career
During his career he played for a few English clubs in the 1990s, after starting out at Manchester United. He scored the opening goal in a 4–0 Champions League win against Galatasaray and played 20 first team games for the club, although he failed to add any more goals. He was part of an acclaimed batch of youngsters to come through the United ranks in this period, after winning the FA Youth Cup in 1992, with his colleagues who lifted the trophy including David Beckham, Nicky Butt and Gary Neville.

Although born in England, Davies was capped for the Welsh national team against Switzerland in 1996. After leaving Manchester United for Luton Town in a £150,000 deal in August 1997, Davies struggled to recapture his early promise and his league career was to end with spells with Macclesfield Town and Rochdale. He then crossed the Welsh border, becoming Peter Davenport's first signing at Bangor City in the Welsh Premier League in 2001. He was named as the Welsh Premier League's player of the season in 2002–03. He also played for Rhyl and Total Network Solutions and would briefly join Airbus UK.

Coaching and management
In 2006, Davies joined the coaching staff at Chester City, predominantly as part of the youth set-up. In April 2007, he was appointed as the club's caretaker manager after the departure of Mark Wright. He took charge for the final game of the season, as Chester lost 2–0 at Lincoln City.

Despite the loss, Davies was offered an interview for the job on a permanent basis but Bobby Williamson was subsequently appointed, although Davies remained at the club as youth team manager. The following March, Davies was again appointed as Chester's caretaker manager following Williamson's sacking. Despite losing his two games in caretaker charge, Davies was named manager until the end of the season on 11 March 2008. His first win followed in a 2–1 success against Darlington on 22 March and Chester went on to clinch survival in their penultimate match of the season with a 0–0 draw against Stockport County. A few days earlier, Davies celebrated his 34th birthday with a new two-year contract at the club.

Davies endured a difficult start to the 2008–09 season, with Chester conceding six to both Dagenham & Redbridge and Rochdale in the first three months of the season and making early exits from all three cup competitions. He was sacked on 10 November 2008. Exactly a month later, it was announced Davies had returned to Chester as youth team manager.

In 2010, Davies joined Manchester City as part of their youth coaching programme. From 2013 to 2015, he was assistant to EDS manager Patrick Vieira. In January 2016, Davies succeeded Vieira as manager, when the Frenchman left the club to join New York City. He left the position in 2018 to become Head of Academy Coaching, with specific focus on the younger age groups.

In July 2019, Davies joined Vincent Kompany as part of the coaching set-up at Anderlecht. On 22 August, Davies became the head coach after Kompany decided to step down from managerial duties to focus primarily on being a player. Davies's first match in charge was a 1–0 loss to Genk, and his second brought Anderlecht their first win of the season, 1–0 over Standard Liège. However, in his next three games, he oversaw two defeats to Club Brugge and Royal Antwerp and a goalless draw against Waasland-Beveren. On 3 October, Davies was demoted back to assistant manager, with the club appointing former manager Franky Vercauteren. According to journalist Kristof Terreur, Davies was seen as a "yes man".

On 12 August 2022, Davies was appointed to the new role of Head of Coaching Methodology at Tottenham Hotspur's academy.

Career statistics

Honours
Manchester United
 FA Youth Cup: 1991–92

Individual
 Welsh Premier League Player of the Season: 2002–03

References

External links

Welsh Premier League profile
Manchester United stats

1974 births
Living people
People from Winsford
Welsh footballers
Wales international footballers
English footballers
English people of Welsh descent
Manchester United F.C. players
Exeter City F.C. players
Huddersfield Town A.F.C. players
Luton Town F.C. players
Macclesfield Town F.C. players
Rochdale A.F.C. players
Premier League players
English Football League players
Chester City F.C. managers
R.S.C. Anderlecht managers
Welsh football managers
Cymru Premier players
The New Saints F.C. players
Bangor City F.C. players
Rhyl F.C. players
Airbus UK Broughton F.C. players
Manchester City F.C. non-playing staff
Tottenham Hotspur F.C. non-playing staff
Sportspeople from Cheshire
Association football midfielders
Association football coaches